Epiphthora hyperaenicta is a moth of the family Gelechiidae. It was described by Turner in 1927. It is found in Australia, where it has been recorded from Tasmania.

The wingspan is about 12 mm. The forewings are pale-grey with fine fuscous irroration. The hindwings are grey.

References

Moths described in 1927
Epiphthora